Bryan W. "Sailor" Roberts (March 7, 1931 – June 23, 1995) was an American professional poker player.

Before becoming a poker professional, Roberts was a rounder and traveled the country looking for games with Doyle Brunson and Amarillo Slim. In addition to his career as a poker player, he was also a renowned contract bridge player.

Roberts participated in the first World Series of Poker in 1970 along with Amarillo Slim, Doyle Brunson, Johnny Moss, Puggy Pearson, Crandell Addington, and Carl Cannon. Roberts won his first WSOP bracelet at the 1974 World Series of Poker in the $5,000 Deuce to Seven Draw event. He won the 1975 World Series of Poker  Main Event, gaining his second and final WSOP bracelet and $210,000.

Roberts earned his nickname "Sailor" for having served in the United States Navy during the Korean War.

Roberts died on June 23, 1995, from cirrhosis caused by hepatitis.

He was posthumously inducted into the Poker Hall of Fame in 2012.

World Series of Poker bracelets

References

External links
Hendon Mob tournament results

1931 births
1995 deaths
American poker players
American contract bridge players
World Series of Poker bracelet winners
World Series of Poker Main Event winners
United States Navy personnel of the Korean War
United States Navy sailors
People from Houston
People from Las Vegas
People from Washington County, Oregon
Poker Hall of Fame inductees